Laguna Verde Nuclear Power Plant (LVNPP) is located on the coast of the Gulf of Mexico, in Alto Lucero, Veracruz, Mexico.  It is the only nuclear power plant in Mexico and produces about 4.5% of the country's electrical energy. It consists of two units GE Boiling Water Reactors (BWR-5) each one with installed capacity of 682 MW using low enriched uranium (3%) as fuel. Unit-1 (U-1) started its operation on July 29, 1990. Unit-2 (U-2) started its operation on April 10, 1995. Initial architects in 1975 for the plant were Burns and Roe Inc and later Ebasco Services designed and supervised the project. The steam turbine and other components were manufactured by Mitsubishi Electric.
The plant is owned and operated by Comisión Federal de Electricidad (CFE), the national electric company owned by the Mexican government.

Laguna Verde has been considered a strategic facility for the National Power System (SEN) due to its high power generation capacity, lowest operating cost, and frequency and voltage regulation capacity. All the electric power generated is delivered to its single client, the National Energy Control Center (CENACE). CENACE is entrusted with the function of planning, directing, and supervising the transmission and distribution of electric power to end users. CENACE has classified LVNPP as Base Load Power Plant since the beginning of its operations.

The annual generation average for LVNPP in the last five years has been of 10.5 TWh, electric energy sufficient to meet the demand of more than 4 million inhabitants.

In 2020 the Ministry of Energy authorised the operating licence extension for unit 1 of an additional 30 years, to a 60-year lifetime to 2050.

Description

The generation of electric power at the CLV is based on the technology of nuclear fission of uranium atoms, which takes place in the reactor. The energy released by the nuclear fission is transferred as heat from the fuel to the cooling water, which boils into steam. The quality of steam is controlled through a separator and dryer. The separator and dryer are part of the internal processes of the reactor pressure vessel. The turbine transforms power from steam (kinetic energy) into mechanical energy causing an electric generator to move (electric power production). Once the steam has gone through the turbine, it is cooled in a condenser; the water obtained in this manner is pumped again toward the nuclear reactor, to restart the generation cycle.

Steam flow rate from each reactor is 3944 kilotons/hour (kt/h) to generate 682 MW of electric power. Both Reactor Units (U1 and U2) operate using 444 enriched uranium assemblies, storing power equal to 38.9 million oil barrels. This nuclear fuel is specifically designed to be admitted into the core of the reactor. The fuel is purchased only from qualified vendors worldwide. After 18 months of operation, between 25% and 30% of the nuclear fuel is replaced. This activity is called "Refueling Outage" process.

Power Uprate
In 2007 CFE signed a contract with an investment of USD 600 million  to increase the original capability of each of the units of Laguna Verde by 20%, equivalent to 255 MW, in order to tend the growth of the demand of electric power in Mexico. This power uprate will allow to LVNPP an additional annual generation of 2.1 TWh, equivalent to the demand of a city of 800,000 inhabitants.

Work began in 2008 by Iberdrola and Alstom and is expected to finish late 2010. The main modifications consist in a turbine and condenser retrofit and the replacement of the electric generator, main steam reheater and the feedwater heater. The budget for the project is USD 605 million.

Awards
The following table shows the chronologic developments at Laguna Verde.

Laguna Verde has obtained several awards. The plant received the National Quality Award (IFCT 2007), and Golden Award from Iberoamerican Foundation for Quality Management (FUNDIBEQ 2009).

In 2009, Laguna Verde obtained Annual recognition as a Socially Responsible Enterprise awarded by the Mexican Center for Philanthropy.

See also

 Nuclear power
 Probabilistic Risk Assessment

References

External links
México apostará fuerte a explotar “energías limpias”, incluida la nuclear  (La Crónica de Hoy,  31 March 2010)
Repotenciación de la planta de energía nuclear en Laguna Verde (Mexican Presidency Official Website, 22 May 2006)
Profile of Laguna Verde NPP (Publication inside WANO, Volume 13 Number 2 Year 2005)
Entrega Premio Fundación Iberoamericana Edición 2009 (FUNDIBEQ, 2009)
Conoce sobre la generación de Energía Eléctrica por medios Nucleares (CFE)
Listado de centrales nucleoeléctricas generadoras en México (CFE)

Nuclear power stations in Mexico
Buildings and structures in Veracruz
Veracruz (city)